The National Independent Party is a political party in Lesotho.

National Independent Party may also refer to:
National Independent Party (Guyana), a political party in Guyana
 National Independent Party (Ireland), a political party in Ireland
Greenback Party, a political party in the United States 1874–1889, known at one point as the National Independent Party

See also
Independent National Party (disambiguation)